The Church of St Margaret Marloes is the Church in Wales parish church for the parish of Eglwyscummin, in southwestern Carmarthenshire, Wales. The present building dates from the 14th and 15th centuries with restoration work being undertaken in 1878 and again in 1900. The church has a round churchyard, an indication that this site has likely been used since prehistoric times. A tombstone dating back to the fifth century was found in the churchyard.  It is believed that Saint Cynin founded the church as one of a series of missionary stations in the fifth century.

An Ogham stone was found in the churchyard prior to 1900. The stone's inscription is in Latin and Celtic, with the word "ingenia" being substituted for the Latin word "filia".  This type of Ogham stone inscription was common in Ireland, but was the only example of it outside of Ireland when it was discovered at the church.

The church is a small building set in a hollow. It was said to be ruinous in 1710 and has a sprocketed, eighteenth-century roof. There is good stained glass windows, and a large carved oak altar and church fittings dating from 1882. Margaret Marloes, to whom it is dedicated, was the niece of Guy de Brian, Lord of Laugharne; a fourteenth-century effigy of her was brought inside the church from the churchyard in 1902 as it was getting badly eroded.

In 1900 this was a rural parish with a population of 240 persons. The church was in need of immediate repairs and did not have enough money to perform them.  The Society for the Protection of Ancient Buildings examined the building to estimate the cost of the needed repairs. An appeal for restoration funds was made through the journal Archaeologica Cambrensis with the consent of the local bishop.

It was determined that the present structure dates back to at least the thirteenth century.  The lack of ornamentation of the church made the dating process more difficult. During the examination, a small square opening on the north wall of the nave and a partially underground arch in the south wall were discovered and suggest there may have been an earlier church structure beneath the present one. The needed repairs were completed in 1901.

The church was designated a Grade I-listed building on 30 November 1966, as an example of "an excellent small medieval church with vaulted nave and porch; a notable example of an Arts and Crafts restoration associated with Philip Webb and with exceptional interior fittings and stained glass". The cross in the churchyard became a Grade II listed building 1 December 2001.

References

Bibliography

External links
 

Eglwyscummin
Eglwyscummin